Gregory Brezina (born January 7, 1946) is a former American football linebacker who played twelve seasons in the National Football League for the Atlanta Falcons. He made 12 interceptions and 14 fumble recoveries.

Greg Brezina was raised in Louise, Texas and played football at the University of Houston. He and his five brothers all played football at the University of Houston, an NCAA Division I Record. His brother Bobby Brezina played for the Houston Oilers of the American Football League.

References

1946 births
Living people
American football linebackers
Houston Cougars football players
Atlanta Falcons players
Western Conference Pro Bowl players
Players of American football from Texas
People from Sinton, Texas